Wellington (Shropshire) is a former United Kingdom Parliamentary constituency, formally known as The Mid (or Wellington) Division of Shropshire. It was a constituency of the House of Commons of the Parliament of the United Kingdom from 1885 to 1918. It elected one Member of Parliament.

Members of Parliament

Elections

Elections in the 1880s

Elections in the 1890s

Elections in the 1900s

Elections in the 1910s 

General Election 1914–15:

Another General Election was required to take place before the end of 1915. The political parties had been making preparations for an election to take place and by July 1914, the following candidates had been selected; 
Liberal: Charles Henry
Unionist:

References

See also
Parliamentary constituencies in Shropshire#Historical constituencies
List of former United Kingdom Parliament constituencies
Unreformed House of Commons

Parliamentary constituencies in Shropshire (historic)
Constituencies of the Parliament of the United Kingdom established in 1885
Constituencies of the Parliament of the United Kingdom disestablished in 1918
Wellington, Shropshire